Crooklyn is the title of the soundtrack to the 1994 Spike Lee film of the same name. The soundtrack was released in two parts. Volume 1 was released May 10, 1994 just prior to the film's release and Volume II was released in 1995, both on MCA Records. The soundtrack albums feature music that was popular during the 1970s, two exceptions being "Crooklyn" by The Crooklyn Dodgers and "People Make the World Go Round" by Marc Dorsey, both of which were recorded specifically for the film. The two albums comprise 28 songs from the film, though some tracks, such as "Hey Joe" by The Jimi Hendrix Experience are omitted from both releases.

Track listing

Volume 1

Volume II

Charts

References

External links

1994 soundtrack albums
1995 soundtrack albums
Albums produced by Q-Tip (musician)
Biographical film soundtracks
Funk soundtracks
Jazz soundtracks
MCA Records soundtracks
Pop soundtracks
Rhythm and blues soundtracks
Soul soundtracks